Kesuj (also Romanized as Kesūj; also known as Kesūch, Kosūch, and Kosvach) is a village in Garmsir Rural District, in the Central District of Ardestan County, Isfahan Province, Iran. At the 2006 census, its population was 71, in 22 families.

References 

Populated places in Ardestan County